The Tour of Sweden (or Postgirot Open) was an annual professional road bicycle racing stage race held in Sweden from 1982 to 2002. It replaced the former Six Days Race, which was held between 1924 and 1975.

Past winners 

 1982 : 
 1983 : 
 1984 : 
 1985 : 
 1986 : 
 1987 :  
 1988 : 
 1989 : 
 1990 : 
 1991 : 
 1992 : 
 1993 : 
 1994 : 
 1995 : 
 1996 : 
 1997 : 
 1998 : 
 1999 : 
 2000 : 
 2001 : 
 2002 :

References

Cycle races in Sweden
Recurring sporting events established in 1982
Recurring sporting events disestablished in 2002
Defunct cycling races in Sweden
Men's road bicycle races
1982 establishments in Sweden
2002 disestablishments in Sweden